Barker's Farm (also known as Barker's Farmstand or the Barker Farm) is an American farm and orchard in North Andover, Massachusetts. The business has been operational since 1642, making it one of the oldest companies in the United States. They specialize in locally grown organic fruits and vegetables.

History
The farm was established in 1642 and has been owned by the Barker family since; the current owner, Dianne Barker, is an eleventh generation owner.

References

Companies established in 1642
Companies based in Essex County, Massachusetts
North Andover, Massachusetts
Farms in Massachusetts
1642 establishments in Massachusetts